The Fiji Financial Intelligence Unit (FIU) is a Fiji government agency established in 2006 under the Financial Transaction Reporting Act of 2004.  It is tasked with the collection and analysis of financial information and intelligence.

References

External links 

Government agencies of Fiji
Financial crime prevention